Love and Desire (French: Le désir et l'amour) is a 1951 French-Spanish drama film directed by Henri Decoin and Luis María Delgado and starring Martine Carol, Antonio Vilar and Carmen Sevilla. It was based on the 1929 novel of the same title by Auguste Bailly.

It was shot at the Epinay Studios in Paris and on location in Madrid, Torremolinos and Malaga. The film's sets were designed by the art directors Julio Molina and René Renoux.

Synopsis
A French film crew are working on location in southern Spain. When the leading man refuses to swim across a river, his place is taken by a local man who is soon hired as a stuntman for the whole film. Much to the anger of his Spanish fiancée, he falls in love with the film's female star.

Cast
 Martine Carol as Martine - la star
 Antonio Vilar as Antonio - le pêcheur
 Carmen Sevilla as Lola - sa finacée
 Albert Préjean as Titi - le régisseur général français
 Françoise Arnoul as Françoise - la script-girl
 Gérard Landry as Gérard - le jeune premier
 Parisys as Adèle - l'habilleuse
 Rafael Cortés as Le 2nd pêcheur
 Joaquín Roa as Miguel - le régisseur espagnol
 Ena Sedeño as L'amie de Lola
 José María Rodríguez as Le 1er pêcheur
 Tony Hernández as Manolo
 Matilde López Roldán as L'autre amie de Lola

References

Bibliography
 Bentley, Bernard. A Companion to Spanish Cinema. Boydell & Brewer 2008.
 Goble, Alan. The Complete Index to Literary Sources in Film. Walter de Gruyter, 1999.

External links

1951 films
Spanish drama films
1950s French-language films
Films directed by Henri Decoin
Films directed by Luis María Delgado
1951 drama films
French drama films
Films set in Spain
Films shot in Spain
Films shot at Epinay Studios
Films about filmmaking
Films based on French novels
1950s French films